Shurland is a place near Eastchurch, Isle of Sheppey, Kent, England. Shurland Hall stood here and was visited by Henry VIII of England and used during World War I for billeting.

References

Geography of Kent
Isle of Sheppey
Henry VIII